Motown 50 is a compilation album released to coincide with the 50th anniversary of Motown Records.

Track listing

Charts

Certifications

References

Motown compilation albums
2008 compilation albums
Record label compilation albums